Ghaniabad Rural District is in the Central District of Ray County, Tehran province, Iran. At the National Census of 2006, its population was 67,933 in 16,890 households. There were 31,196 inhabitants in 8,744 households at the following census of 2011. At the most recent census of 2016, the population of the rural district was 29,013 in 8,559 households. The largest of its seven villages was Khavar Shahr, with 13,203 people.

References 

Ray County, Iran

Rural Districts of Tehran Province

Populated places in Tehran Province

Populated places in Ray County, Iran